The nominees for the 50th Australian Film Institute Awards were announced in Sydney, Australia, on 29 October 2008. The nominees for Best Documentary, Best Short Fiction Film, and Best Short Animation were announced on 7 August 2008.

Feature Film Awards

Best Film 
The Black Balloon
The Jammed
The Square
Unfinished Sky

Best Actor 
Guy Pearce - Death Defying Acts
Rhys Wakefield - The Black Balloon
David Roberts - The Square
William McInnes - Unfinished Sky

Best Actress 
Emma Lung - The Jammed
Noni Hazlehurst - Bitter & Twisted
Monic Hendrickx - Unfinished Sky
Veronica Sywak - The Jammed

Best Supporting Actor 
Luke Ford - The Black Balloon
Erik Thomson - The Black Balloon
Anthony Hayes - The Square
Joel Edgerton - The Square

Non-Feature Awards

Best Documentary 
Beyond Our Ken
Not Quite Hollywood
The Oasisthe oasis
Rare Chicken Rescue

Best Short Animation 
Chainsaw
Dog With Electric Collar
Mutt
PaperCityArchitects

Best Short Fiction 
Four
The Ground Beneath
Jerrycan
My Rabbit Hoppy

Controversies and comments

AFI Website "contenders" 
On the website of the Australian Film Institute, it listed 25 expected nominees for the Best Film category. The 25 contenders were:

All My Friends Are Leaving Brisbane
Bitter and Twisted
Black Water
Cactus
Children of the Silk Road

Death Defying Acts
Five Moments of Infidelity
Gabriel
Green Fire Envy
Hey, Hey, It's Esther Blueburger

Men's Group
Punishment
Rats and Cats
Salvation
September

Ten Empty
The Black Balloon
The Independent
The Jammed
The Plex

The Square
The Tender Hook
The Tragedy of Hamlet Prince of Denmark
Three Blind Mice
Unfinished Sky

References 

Australian Film Institute Awards ceremonies
2008 in Australian cinema